The Myx Music Awards for 2010 comprised nineteen categories of "favorite" and two special awards.

Nomination night
Nomination night took place in February, 2010 at Eastwood Central Plaza, Quezon City, with a number of hosts and performances. With six nominations each, Gloc-9 (Favorite Music Video, Favorite Male Artist, Favorite Urban Video, Favorite Collaboration, Favorite Remake, Favorite MYX Live! Performance), Rico Blanco (Favorite Music Video, Favorite Song, Favorite Artist, Favorite Male Artist, Favorite Rock Video, Favorite MYX Live! Performance) and Chicosci (Favorite Music Video, Favorite Song, Favorite Artist, Favorite Group, Favorite Rock Video, Favorite MYX Celebrity VJ) got the most number of nominations.

Nominees and winners
Winners are in bold text.

Favorite Music Video
 "Antukin" by Rico Blanco
 "Bahay Kubo" by Hale
 "Diamond Shotgun" by Chicosci
 "Kasalanan" by 6cyclemind & Gloc9 (Winner)
 "Radical" by Hilera

Favorite Song
 "Antukin" by Rico Blanco
 "Back In Time" by Kyla & Jay-R (Winner)
 "Di Na Mababawi" by Sponge Cola
 "Diamond Shotgun" by Chicosci
 "Simulan Mo Na" by Pedicab

Favorite Artist
 Chicosci
 Christian Bautista
 Rico Blanco
 Sarah Geronimo (Winner)
 Sponge Cola

Favorite Female Artist
 Charice
 Karylle
 Kyla
 Sarah Geronimo (Winner)
 Yeng Constantino

Favorite Male Artist
 Billy Crawford
 Christian Bautista
 Gloc9
 Richard Poon
 Rico Blanco (Winner)

Favorite Group
 6cyclemind
 Chicosci
 Hale
 Pedicab
 Sponge Cola (Winner)

Favorite Mellow Video
 "And I Love You So" by Regine Velasquez
 "Old Friend" by Kyla (Winner)
 "Tell Me Your Name" by Christian Bautista
 "This Time I’ll Be Sweeter" by Rachelle Ann Go
 "You And I" by Richard Poon

Favorite Rock Video
 "Antukin" by Rico Blanco
 "Diamond Shotgun" by Chicosci (Winner)
 "Radical" by Hilera
 "Simulan Mo Na" by Pedicab
 "Wala" by Kamikazee

Favorite Urban Video
 "Katulad Ko" by D-Coy feat. Luke Mejares & Artstrong
 "Mainit" by Knowa Lazarus, Kenjhons & Chelo Aestrid with DJ Flavamatikz
 "Rendezvous" by Dice & K9 Mobbstarr
 "That Girl" by Young JV
 "Upuan" by Gloc9 feat. Jeazelle Grutas (Winner)

Favorite New Artist
 Archipelago
 Duster
 Letter Day Story
 Peryodiko
 Young JV (Winner)

Favorite Indie Artist
 Angulo
 April Morning Skies
 Archipelago (Winner)
 Ciudad
 Us-2 Evil-0

Favorite Collaboration
 "Ayt!" by Sponge Cola & Gary Valenciano
 "Back In Time" by Kyla & Jay-R
 "Higante" by Francis M & Ely Buendia (Winner)
 "Kasalanan" by 6cyclemind & Gloc9
 "Tabi" by Paraluman & Kean Cipriano

Favorite Remake
 "Balita" by Gloc9 feat. Gabby Alipe
 "Heart To Heart" by Kyla
 "Human Nature" by Billy Crawford
 "Tell Me Your Name" by Christian Bautista
 "You Changed My Life" by Sarah Geronimo (Winner)

Favorite Media Soundtrack
 "Best About Life" by SinoSikat
 "Record Breaker" by Sarah Geronimo (Winner)
 "Tayong Dalawa" by Gary Valenciano
 "Whisper I Love You" by Kim Chiu & Gerald Anderson
 "You Changed My Life" by Sarah Geronimo

Favorite Guest Appearance in a Music Video
 Cristine Reyes ("Ayuz" by Rico Blanco)
 Heart Evangelista ("Bahay Kubo" by Hale) (Winner)
 Jake Cuenca ("Neon Brights" by Taken by Cars)
 John Lloyd Cruz ("You Changed My Life" by Sarah Geronimo)
 Maricar Reyes ("Kasalanan" by 6cyclemind & Gloc9)

Favorite MYX Celebrity VJ
 Billy Crawford (Winner)
 Chicosci
 Kamikazee
 Martin Nievera & Gary Valenciano
 Rhian Ramos

Favorite MYX Live! Performance
 Gloc9
 Kamikazee
 Richard Poon
 Rico Blanco (Winner)
 Zsa Zsa Padilla

Favorite MYX Bandarito Performance
 Bembol Rockers
 Blue Boy Bites Back
 Intolerant
 The Lowtechs
 Roots of Nature (Winner)

Favorite International Video
  "Fire" by 2NE1
  "Love Story" by Taylor Swift (Winner)
  "Nobody" by Wonder Girls
  "One Time" by Justin Bieber
  "The Climb" by Miley Cyrus

Special awards

Special Citation
 Christian Bautista

Myx Magna Award
 Jose Mari Chan

References

External links
The MYX Music Awards Nominations Night Behind The Scenes and Interviews

Philippine music awards